Walter S. Steele (died March 3, 1962) was an American editor and publisher of The National Republic monthly magazine as well as an anti-Communist, anti-Immigration activist.

Background

Walter S. Steele was born circa 1892 in Indiana.  He had two sisters and a brother.

Career

Steele started his career by working for Indiana newspapers. In 1916, he became an alderman in Muncia through 1920.

National Republic magazine

Steele moved to Washington, DC, and in 1924 joined The National Republic—originally The National Republican of Muncie, published April 1925 to March 1960, which billed itself as ""A National Organization Defending American Ideals and Institutions."

Anti-Communism

During the 1930s and 1940s, Steele took a strongly anti-Communist stance in his magazine.

Steele appeared before the Dies Committee and its successor the House Un-American Activities Committee (HUAC).

During his July 21, 1947, testimony before HUAC, Steele leveled "spectacular charges," accused hundreds of Americans as communists, and claimed to be a spokesman for "20 million patriots."  His testimony was "possibly the most irresponsible ever presented" to HUAC.  (HUAC supported him so strongly that the committee issued a 188-page, stand-alone book of his testimony in 1947.  In terms of timing, the testimony was most helpful to HUAC's Hollywood investigations into movie stars as famous as Charlie Chaplin - see the Hollywood Ten.)

On May 2, 1949, Steele spoke with Congressman Richard Nixon and HUAC research director Benjamin Mandel at a Knights of Columbus annual town hall.

Anti-Immigration

Opponents accused him of "having anti-labor and anti-liberal tendencies." In 1937, Steele responded with denial to an accusation of distributing pro-Nazi propaganda made before a Massachusetts legislative investigating committee.

Steele also served as chairman of the National Security Committee of the American Coalition of Patriotic, Civic and Fraternal Societies, founded by John B. Trevor Sr. (an American lawyer and "one of the most influential unelected officials affiliated with the U.S. Congress,"   even "the most influential lobbyist for restriction" of immigration, who along with David A. Reed and Samuel Gompers shaped the Immigration Act of 1924, which established restrictive immigration quotas through 1964).

Steele was also an advisory board member of the "Paul Reveres," an "anti-Semitic coterie."

Personal life and death

Steele married Valerie Knoobe; they had two daughters and a son.

Walter S. Steele died age 70 on March 2 or 3, 1962, in his Rockville, Maryland, home.

References

External links
Register of the Myers G. Lowman papers
Lewis S. Sorley Papers
Thomas H. Eliot Papers, 1941-1942

1890s births
1962 deaths
Old Right (United States)
American anti-communists